Widgeon Lake is a lake in British Columbia, Canada in Pinecone Burke Provincial Park. The area includes a trail that is roughly 25 km long and a stunning glacial lake at the end. The lake is used mainly for hiking, trail running, camping, and canoeing.

Lakes of British Columbia
New Westminster Land District